Events during the year 1980 in Northern Ireland.

Incumbents
 Secretary of State - Humphrey Atkins

Events
1 January – First national anti-H-Block march.
27 October – Seven Provisional Irish Republican Army (IRA) prisoners go on hunger strike in Long Kesh.
8 December – Taoiseach Charles Haughey meets with the British Prime Minister Margaret Thatcher at Dublin Castle, the first visit by a British prime minister since independence.
15 December – Thirty more IRA prisoners join the hunger strike.
18 December – Hunger striker Sean McKenna critically ill. Belief that settlement is imminent brings an end to the hunger strike.
Work begins on the building of the Foyle Bridge in Derry.
W. A. McCutcheon's official survey The Industrial Archaeology of Northern Ireland is published.

Arts and literature
23 September – Field Day Theatre Company presents its first production, the premiere of Brian Friel's Translations at the Guildhall, Derry.
Crescent Arts Centre is founded in Belfast.
Annual Enniskillen Drama Festival revived.
Ron Hutchinson's The Irish Play is first performed, in London.
Medbh McGuckian publishes the first collections of her poems in two pamphlets, Portrait of Joanna and Single Ladies: Sixteen Poems and wins an Eric Gregory Award.
Bernard MacLaverty publishes his novel Lamb.

Sport

Boxing
Hugh Russell wins Flyweight Bronze medal at the 1980 Summer Olympics.

Football

Irish League
Winners: Linfield

Irish Cup
Winners: Linfield 2 – 0 Crusaders

Motorcycling
Robert Dunlop makes first appearance at the Cookstown 100.

Births
7 January – Zöe Salmon, Blue Peter presenter and former Miss Northern Ireland in 1999.
17 January – Gareth McLearnon, flautist.
11 February – Cormac McAnallen, Tyrone Gaelic footballer (died 2004).
3 April – Adrian McCoubrey, cricketer.
14 April – Grant McCann, footballer.
11 June – Pete Snodden, radio DJ.
3 July – Andrew White, cricketer.
9 July – Michael Ingham, footballer.
23 September – Malachi Cush, singer-songwriter.
6 October – Stephen Carson, footballer.

Deaths
5 July – A. J. Potter, composer (born 1918).
22 November – Norah McGuinness, artist (born 1901).

Full date unknown
Ronnie Bunting, Official IRA member and a founder member of the Irish National Liberation Army, assassinated.
Sam Cree, playwright (born 1928).
Jimmy McCambridge, footballer (born 1905).
Johnny McKenna, footballer (born 1926).

See also
1980 in Scotland
1980 in Wales

References

 
Northern Ireland